Hardijs Baumanis (10 December 1967 – 6 April 2015) was a Latvian diplomat. He served as Ambassador of Latvia to Lithuania and Azerbaijan from 2010 until his death. He died on 6 April 2015 in the Azerbaijani capital Baku, aged 47.

References

1967 births
2015 deaths
Ambassadors of Latvia to Azerbaijan
Ambassadors of Latvia to Lithuania
20th-century Latvian people
Deaths in Azerbaijan
20th-century diplomats
Diplomats from Riga